La Renaissance Apartments is an apartment building located at 424 Spadina Crescent East in the Central Business District of Saskatoon, Saskatchewan, Canada. The building was completed in 1983 and at 24 stories (79.2 m) is the second tallest building in the city and contains 96 condominiums. It is similar in design to Regina's and Saskatchewan's tallest building, the Delta Regina Hotel.

See also
 List of tallest buildings in Saskatoon
 Radisson Hotel Saskatoon

References

Buildings and structures in Saskatoon
Residential condominiums in Canada
Residential skyscrapers in Canada
Residential buildings completed in 1983
1983 establishments in Saskatchewan